Tokulu is an island in Lulunga district, in the Ha'apai islands of Tonga.

See also

List of lighthouses in Tonga

References

Islands of Tonga
Haʻapai
Lighthouses in Tonga